The Ministry of Tourism  is a ministry of the Government of Haiti. This ministry is responsible for tourist attractions and accommodations for travelers, along with playing an integral role in the Prime Minister's Cabinet.

Government ministries of Haiti